Hell, etc. may refer to:

Hell, etc. (label), a vanity label founded by Marilyn Manson
Hell, etc. (exhibition), an art exhibition by Marilyn Manson held in Athens, Greece